The Government of the 7th Dáil or the 6th Executive Council (9 March 1932 – 8 February 1933) was formed after the 1932 general election held on 16 February. It was led by Fianna Fáil leader Éamon de Valera as President of the Executive Council, taking office after ten years of government led by W. T. Cosgrave of Cumann na nGaedheal. De Valera had previously served as President of Dáil Éireann, or President of the Republic, from April 1919 to January 1922 during the revolutionary period of the Irish Republic.

The 6th Executive Council lasted for  days.

6th Executive Council of the Irish Free State

Nomination of President of the Executive Council
The 7th Dáil first met on 9 March 1932. In the debate on the nomination of the President of the Executive Council, Fianna Fáil leader Éamon de Valera was proposed, and the motion was approved by 81 votes to 68. The Labour Party supported the nomination of de Valera and the formation of the executive council, but did not form part of the government. He was then appointed as President by Governor-General James McNeill.

Members of the Executive Council
The members of the Executive Council were proposed by the President and approved by the Dáil. They were then appointed by the Governor-General.

Parliamentary Secretaries
On 10 March 1932, the Executive Council appointed Parliamentary Secretaries on the nomination of the President.

See also
Dáil Éireann (Irish Free State)
Government of Ireland
Constitution of the Irish Free State
Politics of the Republic of Ireland

Footnotes

References

Ministries of George V
Government 07
Governments of the Irish Free State
1932 establishments in Ireland
1933 disestablishments in Ireland
Cabinets established in 1932
Cabinets disestablished in 1933
Minority governments
7th Dáil